North Monmouth is an unincorporated village in the town of Monmouth, Kennebec County, Maine, United States. North Monmouth has a post office with ZIP code 04265.

References

Villages in Kennebec County, Maine
Villages in Maine